Milax nigricans is a species of gastropods belonging to the family Milacidae.

The species is found in terrestrial environments.

References

Milacidae